Diane Jean Dodds, Baroness Dodds of Duncairn,  (born 16 August 1958), is a Democratic Unionist Party (DUP) politician in Northern Ireland. She served as a Member of the European Parliament (MEP) for the Northern Ireland constituency from 2009 to 2020. She previously sat in the Northern Ireland Assembly from 2003 to 2007 as MLA for West Belfast. In 2020, Dodds returned to the Assembly as MLA for Upper Bann. She is married to Lord Dodds, and as such she is styled as "The Right Honourable The Lady Dodds of Duncairn".

Early life
Dodds was born into a farming family in Rathfriland, County Down, where she attended Banbridge Academy before moving on to study at Queen's University Belfast. While studying, she met her future husband and future DUP MP for North Belfast, Nigel Dodds.

Political career
In 2003, Dodds was elected to the Northern Ireland Assembly to represent Belfast West. She was the first Unionist elected to a regional assembly from West Belfast in more than 20 years (the last being Thomas Passmore to the 1982-86 Assembly). Her strongest support base during the election campaign was in the Shankill Road area of the constituency.

Following her election to the Assembly, Dodds contested the Court District Electoral Area in the 2005 Local Government Elections. On that occasion she polled in excess of three electoral quotas and her surplus votes enabled the election of two running mates. In that election, she polled more votes than any other local government candidate in Northern Ireland. Despite increasing her vote from the 2003 Assembly election, she narrowly lost her seat to Sinn Féin in 2007.

Dodds has also been active within Belfast City Council, where she was Chief Whip of the 14-councillor DUP group. She chaired the Policy and Resources Committee on the council and actively supported a campaign to host a homecoming parade for the Royal Irish Regiment and other armed forces returning home from the Iraq and Afghanistan wars.

European Parliament 2009-2020
On 3 February 2009, Dodds was selected by the DUP as its candidate for the 2009 election to the European Parliament and was elected an MEP on 8 June, representing Northern Ireland.

Despite her election, the results were disappointing for Dodds and her party. The DUP's share of the vote fell 14% to just over 18%. While the Westminster expenses scandal and a perceived poor performance in live debates were cited as reasons for the poor result, Dodds herself blamed the decline in DUP votes on former DUP member Jim Allister of the Traditional Unionist Voice (TUV) splinter party, who gained 66,000 first preference votes. Allister had accused the DUP of "betrayal" in going into government with Sinn Féin. Sinn Féin topped the poll, the first time a republican party had done so in a European election in Northern Ireland. Dodds was elected third, behind Jim Nicholson of the UUP, and with fewer votes than the quota (the elections being held under the single transferable vote system).

In September 2018, Dodds voted against a motion asserting the "existence of a clear risk of a serious breach by Hungary of the values on which the Union is founded" - in line with most UKIP and Conservative Party MEPs.

Member of the Local Assembly 2020-present
The DUP announced that following Carla Lockhart's election to the House of Commons in December 2019, Dodds would succeed her as MLA for Upper Bann.  In January 2020, Dodds was elected to the position of MLA for Upper Bann. She took on the MLA role full-time after the UK left the European Union (EU) on 31 January 2020.

References

External links
DUP profile - Diane Dodds
Belfast City Council - Diane Dodds

1958 births
Living people
People educated at Banbridge Academy
Alumni of Queen's University Belfast
Dodds of Duncairn
Democratic Unionist Party MLAs
Members of Belfast City Council
Northern Ireland MLAs 2003–2007
Female members of the Northern Ireland Assembly
MEPs for Northern Ireland 2009–2014
MEPs for Northern Ireland 2014–2019
MEPs for Northern Ireland 2019–2020
Democratic Unionist Party MEPs
Presbyterians from Northern Ireland
Christian creationists
21st-century women MEPs for Northern Ireland
21st-century women politicians from Northern Ireland
Spouses of life peers
Northern Ireland MLAs 2017–2022
Women councillors in Northern Ireland
Northern Ireland MLAs 2022–2027